Xyonysius is a genus of seed bugs in the family Lygaeidae. There are about eight described species in Xyonysius.

Species
These 10 species belong to the genus Xyonysius:
 Xyonysius acticola Baranowski & Slater, 1997
 Xyonysius adjunctor (Barber, 1947)
 Xyonysius basalis (Dallas, 1852)
 Xyonysius californicus (Stal, 1859) (California false chinch bug)
 Xyonysius ellipticus (Berg, 1892)
 Xyonysius humilis (Spinola, 1852)
 Xyonysius naso (Van Duzee, 1933)
 Xyonysius volxemi (Distant, 1888)

References

Further reading

External links

 

Lygaeidae
Articles created by Qbugbot
Pentatomomorpha genera